Reinhart Ahlrichs (16 January 1940 – 12 October 2016) was a German theoretical chemist.

Biography
Ahlrichs was born on the 16 January 1940 in Göttingen. He studied Physics at the University of Göttingen (Diplom (M.Sc.) in 1965) and received his PhD in 1968 with W. A. Bingel. From 1968-69 he was assistant at Göttingen with Werner Kutzelnigg and from 1969-70 Postdoctoral Fellow with C. C. J. Roothaan at the University of Chicago.

After a period as assistant from 1970-75 in Karlsruhe he had been Professor of Theoretical chemistry at the University of Karlsruhe. He also headed a research group at the INT.

His group developed the program TURBOMOLE.

Awards 
 Liebig-Denkmuenze (2000) from the German Chemical Society (GDCh)
 Bunsen-Denkmuenze (2000) from Deutsche Bunsengesellschaft

Memberships 
 International Academy of Quantum Molecular Science (since 1992)
 Heidelberger Akademie der Wissenschaften (since 1991)

External links 
 Homepage
 Research summary (PDF)
 TURBOMOLE program
 ISI Highly Cited Researcher

References

1940 births
2016 deaths
20th-century German chemists
Members of the International Academy of Quantum Molecular Science
Theoretical chemists
German expatriates in the United States
Members of the Göttingen Academy of Sciences and Humanities